The 2006–07 Football League Cup (known as the Carling Cup for sponsorship reasons) was the 47th staging of the Football League Cup, a knock-out competition for the top 92 football clubs played in English football league system. The competition name reflects a sponsorship deal with lager brand Carling.

The competition began in August 2006 and ended with the final on 25 February 2007. The Millennium Stadium in Cardiff hosted the final, as the reconstruction of Wembley Stadium could not be completed in time to host the final.

The winners were Chelsea, beating Arsenal in the final 2-1 after two goals by Didier Drogba.

Format

The competition consists of five single elimination rounds (taking place only on week-nights) before a two-legged semi-final and then a final match at a neutral venue.  The venue for each fixture in round one to the finals will not be neutral.  It will be the home ground of one of the two clubs in each fixture, and will be decided as part of the draw for each round.

There are no replays in the competition.  If necessary, extra-time and penalties will decide each tie's winners on the night.

First round
The 72 Football League clubs compete from the first round, which is divided into North and South sections. Each section is divided equally into a pot of seeded clubs and a pot of unseeded clubs. Clubs' rankings depend upon their finishing position in the 2005-06 season. Therefore, the clubs relegated from the Premier League in 2006; Sunderland (North), Birmingham City and West Bromwich Albion (South) are the top seeds, and the clubs newly promoted to the Football League — Accrington Stanley and Hereford United — are bottom seeds in north and south sections respectively.

At 12:00 BST on 21 June 2006, seeded clubs and unseeded clubs were paired off to create the first round draw. 
The small numbers represent the seeding.
Ties are shown in order of the draw.

1 Score after 90 minutes

Second round
In Round 2, the 36 winners from Round 1 were joined by the 12 Premier League clubs not participating in European competitions.
The draw took place on 26 August 2006 and matches were played during the week commencing 18 September.

1 Score after 90 minutes

Third round
Round 3 was drawn on 23 September from the 24 remaining clubs and the eight Premier League clubs in European competitions. The ties were played the week of 23 October:

1 Score after 90 minutes

Fourth round
The Fourth round draw was made on 25 October 2006.

Quarter-finals
The quarter-final draw was made on 11 November 2006 at 12:00 GMT.

Semi-finals
The semi-final draw was made on 23 December 2006 at 12:00 GMT. Unlike the other rounds, the semi-final ties were played over two legs, with each team playing one leg at home.

First leg

Second leg

Chelsea won 5–1 on aggregate.

Arsenal won 5–3 on aggregate.

Final

See also
Football League Cup

External links

Official Carling Cup website 
Carling Cup at bbc.co.uk

EFL Cup seasons
Cup